Derrell is a given name. Notable people with the name include:

Derrell Dixon (born 1970), US American Heavyweight boxer
Derrell Griffith (born 1943), former Outfielder and Third Baseman in Major League Baseball
Derrell Johnson-Koulianos (born 1987), wide receiver for the Iowa Hawkeyes during the 2007–2010 seasons
Derrell Mitchell (born 1971), former Canadian Football League slotback
Derrell Palmer (1922–2009), American football offensive tackle and defensive tackle
Derrell Robertson (1967–1994), American college football player from Tyler, Texas
Derrell Simpson, political strategist, columnist and former television talk show host

See also
Darrell